Black Butterfly is the fourth studio album by American hard rock band Buckcherry. The album was released on September 12, 2008 in Japan, Canada, and the United Kingdom while being released on September 16 in the United States. It had been in production since late 2007. The limited fan edition was included with two demo songs, "Nothing" and "Stayin' High". Along with the bonus songs, the case came with a year free membership to the Buckcherry Fan Club, "Buckcherry's Bomb Squad". Black Butterfly debuted at number eight on the Billboard 200, making it the band's highest-charting album in the United States.

Singles 

The songs "Rescue Me" and "Don't Go Away" were eventually placed on the band's MySpace page. "Rescue Me" was released for download in the video game series Rock Band. "Don't Go Away" was selected as the second single to be released from the album.

Composition 
Vocalist Josh Todd has mentioned that the songs "Rescue Me" and "A Child Called "It"" were both inspired by the Dave Pelzer book, A Child Called "It". "There were times when I had to put the book down because the abuse of this boy was so bad, but I felt like the book found me… I was compelled to write this song out of inspiration from this guy’s incredible journey."

"Rescue Me" was used as the official theme song for the WWE Judgment Day 2009 pay-per view.

Track listing

Personnel

Buckcherry
 Josh Todd – lead vocals
 Keith Nelson – lead guitar
 Jimmy Ashhurst – bass guitar
 Stevie Dacanay – rhythm guitar
 Xavier Muriel – drums

Certifications

Chart positions

References 

Buckcherry albums
2008 albums
Eleven Seven Label Group albums
Atlantic Records albums